Charre is a town in northern Mozambique, near the border with Malawi.

Transport 

It is served by a station on the branchline of the national railway network that leads into Malawi.

See also 

 Railway stations in Mozambique
 Railway stations in Malawi

References 

Populated places in Mozambique